Minuscule 58 (in the Gregory-Aland numbering), ε 518 (Von Soden), is a Greek minuscule manuscript of the New Testament, on parchment leaves. Palaeographically it has been assigned to the 15th century.
The manuscript has complex contents. It has marginalia.

Description 

The codex contains complete text of the four Gospels on 342 leaves (size ). The text is written in one column per page, 20-21 lines per page. Name of scribe Joannes Serbopulos. According to Scrivener it is carelessly written.

There is also another division according to the Ammonian Sections, but this system is used only partially.

Text 

The Greek text of the codex is a representative of the Byzantine text-type. Hermann von Soden classified it to the textual family Kx. Aland placed it in Category V. According to the Claremont Profile Method it represents Kr text in Luke 1, Luke 10, and Luke 20. Ii creates textual cluster with 56.

C. R. Gregory noticed that it is close to the manuscripts Minuscule 47, 54, 56, 61.

History 

The manuscript was written by John Serbopoulos (possibly copied from 54).

Ussher collated it for Walton's Polyglotte. It was examined by Mill (Nov. coll. 1), Wettstein in 1715, Dobbin, and C. R. Gregory (in 1883). Dobbin compared its readings with Codex Montfortianus and 56 in 1922 places. Gregory expressed the opinion that codices 47, 56, 58 are in the same hand, and one of them copied from 54.

It is currently housed in at the New College (68), at Oxford.

See also 

 List of New Testament minuscules
 Biblical manuscript
 Textual criticism

References

Further reading 

 Orlando Dobbin, Collation of the Codex Montfortianus (London, 1854), p. 31-33.

Greek New Testament minuscules
15th-century biblical manuscripts
New College, Oxford